Elizabeth Ann Signal (born 4 May 1962) is a New Zealand former  cricketer who played as a right-arm medium bowler. She appeared in 6 Test matches and 19 One Day Internationals for New Zealand between 1984 and 1988. She played domestic cricket for Central Districts. 

Her twin sister Rose also played cricket for New Zealand. They were the first twins to play test cricket together.

References

External links

1962 births
Living people
People from Feilding
New Zealand women cricketers
New Zealand women Test cricketers
New Zealand women One Day International cricketers
Central Districts Hinds cricketers
New Zealand twins
Twin sportspeople